The 1973–74 season was the 72nd in the history of the Western Football League.

The champions for the fourth time in their history were Welton Rovers.

League table
The league was increased from sixteen clubs to nineteen after Bristol City Colts and Torquay United Reserves left, and five new clubs joined:

Chippenham Town, rejoining the league after leaving in 1965.
Dawlish
Exmouth Town
Keynsham Town
Tiverton Town

References

1973-74
5